Sabin Ilie (born 11 May 1975) is a Romanian former professional footballer who played as a striker in Romania, Turkey, Spain, Germany, Hungary, China and Greece.

Career
Ilie had a long career, playing for nineteen clubs. He began his career with Electroputere Craiova, and played for Steaua București and Național București before short spells in Turkey, Spain and Germany. He had a spell with Fenerbahçe and Kocaelispor in the Turkish Süper Lig.

Personal life
He is the younger brother of fellow footballer Adrian Ilie.

Honours
Steaua București
Divizia A: 1995–96, 1996–97
Cupa României: 1995–96, 1996–97
Supercupa României: 1995

Individual
Divizia A top scorer: 1996–97 (31 goals)
China League One top scorer: 2008 (18 goals)

References

External links
 
 

1975 births
Living people
Sportspeople from Craiova
Romanian footballers
Association football forwards
Romania under-21 international footballers
Fenerbahçe S.K. footballers
Kocaelispor footballers
CSA Steaua București footballers
FC Dinamo București players
FC Rapid București players
FC Progresul București players
FC UTA Arad players
FC Brașov (1936) players
FC Vaslui players
Iraklis Thessaloniki F.C. players
Debreceni VSC players
Liga I players
La Liga players
Süper Lig players
Valencia CF players
UE Lleida players
FC Energie Cottbus players
Nemzeti Bajnokság I players
Bundesliga players
Super League Greece players
China League One players
Changchun Yatai F.C. players
Jiangsu F.C. players
Romanian expatriate footballers
Expatriate footballers in Spain
Expatriate footballers in Turkey
Expatriate footballers in Greece
Expatriate footballers in Hungary
Expatriate footballers in Germany
Expatriate footballers in China
Romanian expatriate sportspeople in Spain
Romanian expatriate sportspeople in Turkey
Romanian expatriate sportspeople in Greece
Romanian expatriate sportspeople in Hungary
Romanian expatriate sportspeople in Germany
Romanian expatriate sportspeople in China
Romanian football managers